Steer Madness is an animal rights inspired action-adventure game developed and published by Veggie Games Inc. The game was originally released in December 2004 on CD-ROM for Microsoft Windows and Macintosh. By 2009, the original game was no longer available, but it joined the ranks of games made by PETA, Greenpeace, and others.

A remake of the game is currently under development and stated for release in summer 2023.

Gameplay
Steer Madness is a single-player video game where the player assumes the role of Bryce the Cow, a walking, talking bovine determined to put an end to animal exploitation and turn everyone vegan. During gameplay, the player goes on a series of missions to save the animals using many different tactics. The game is based in an open city environment and features several transportation methods, with gameplay similar to the game Grand Theft Auto III (without the guns or violence), making it a nonviolent video game. Players have the option to walk, use a bicycle, or drive (in select missions) through the city to get to different areas of the game. Missions involve many gameplay elements, including climbing, jumping, racing, puzzle solving and operating heavy machinery.

Development
Steer Madness was developed in Vancouver, BC, Canada, by the independent game developer Veggie Games Inc. The majority of the game was made by just one person, founder Johnathan Skinner. This includes all of the programming (which was done from scratch), story, design and a significant portion of the artwork. He worked on the game in his spare time for about a year and a half while working other jobs, then decided to focus all his time into finishing and publishing the game. He registered the company, got a small office and hired an artist to help. After about 6 months of full-time development and the help of a few student interns, the game was complete and ready for release. Skinner, when interviewed by The Globe and Mail, hoped that the game would "sway a few people." He later said he ran the game on a shoestring budget, funding Veggie Games "with a Visa card."

Music for the game was licensed from local independent artists, including Angie Inglis, Anita Athavale, Feisty, Hector and The Winks. Voice acting was done with the help of friends who were convinced to read lines into a microphone while sitting inside a little box which was sound-proofed with swatches of carpet and pillows.

Taking the self-publishing route, game CDs were printed in small batches and sold through the website. Various animal rights groups in Canada, the United States, United Kingdom and Germany purchased wholesale quantities in order to resell the game CDs through their online stores as a form of fundraising, while it was also presented at the 2004 Electronic Entertainment Expo in Los Angeles.

Awards
Steer Madness received two awards shortly after it was released. The first award was Best Animal-Friendly Video Game from the 2004 PETA Proggy Awards, and the second was Innovation in Audio from the 2005 Independent Games Festival.

Reception
Some scholars described it as an example of "an activism game" and said it aligns with "mass-market entertainment game genres."
Others recommended it to "animal conscious parents" and said it encourages veganism.

References

External links
Official Steer Madness website

2004 video games
Action-adventure games
Animal rights mass media
Extreme sports video games
MacOS games
Vegetarian-related mass media
Video games developed in Canada
Windows games
Independent Games Festival winners
Vegetarianism in fiction